The Outer Ring Road is a  long Ring road within the South Indian city of Mysore, Karnataka. The road was originally to be widened to eight lanes, but was reduced to six in order to free up funds for building a missing link along the road. Most of the road was opened in 2012. There are four railway bridges over the course of the road.

See also 
 Kalaburagi Ring Road
 Bengaluru Outer Ring Road
 State Highway 17 (Karnataka)

References 

Ring roads in India
Roads in Mysore